Sembawang Constituency was a single member constituency in Sembawang, Singapore that was formed in 1955 and continued until 1988 when it was merged into Sembawang Group Representation Constituency.

Member of Parliament

Elections

Elections in the 1980s

Elections in 1970s

Elections in 1960s

Elections in 1950s

Note: MIC is allied with Singapore's UMNO and MCA chapters, similar to its Malaysian counterpart with the exception of not using the alliance symbol which was the reason for the elections department of Singapore to view Vangadaslam Jayaram as an independent candidate.

Historical maps

References

1984 GE's result
1980 GE's result
1976 GE's result
1972 GE's result
1968 GE's result
1963 GE's result
1959 GE's result
1955 GE's result

Sembawang